The Socialist Party of Pennsylvania was a socialist political party in the U.S. state of Pennsylvania. It was founded in 1901 in Reading, Pennsylvania and received a state charter from the Socialist Party of America the following year. Reading was one of three cities which found considerable electoral success. Readings Socialists elected multiple state legislators, city councilors as well as mayor J. Henry Stump. The Socialist Party of America nominated former Pennsylvania Representative and SPA member Darlington Hoopes for President in 1952 and 1956. In 1965, the Reading chapter of the party was down to approximately 25 members. The national party was renamed Social Democrats, USA in 1972. 

A successor organization, the Socialist Party USA, was formed in 1973 by the Debs caucus of the old SPA, a group which still supported independent socialist political action. As of  2016 the SPUSA has one local in the state, located in Philadelphia.

Notable party members
 J. Mahlon Barnes, executive secretary of the SPA (1905-1911)
 Ella Reeve Bloor, political activist and candidate for Governor of Pennsylvania
 Darlington Hoopes, a three-term member of the Pennsylvania House of Representatives and two-time SPA nominee for president (1952, 1956)
 James H. Maurer, a three-term member of the Pennsylvania House of Representatives and two-time SPA nominee for vice-president
 J. Henry Stump, mayor of Reading
 Birch Wilson, member of the National Executive Committee of the Socialist Party of America during the 1920s
 Lilith Martin Wilson, member of the Pennsylvania House of Representative and SPP nominee for Governor; also the first woman to run for Governor of Pennsylvania
 George S. Snyder, elected to the Reading City Council on November 4, 1927
 George D. Snyder, won a seat on Reading School Board
 Raymond Hofses, won a seat on Reading School Board
 W. R. Hollinger, became Reading City Controller

References

External links
 Socialist Party of Pennsylvania on Facebook
 Socialist Party of Philadelphia on Facebook
 1920 Platform of the Socialist Party of Pennsylvania
 Socialist Party USA website

Political parties established in 1901
Political parties in Pennsylvania
Pennsylvania
Pennsylvania
 
State and local socialist parties in the United States
Socialism in Pennsylvania